Alston House may refer to:

 Alston-Cobb House, Grove Hill, Alabama, listed on the National Register of Historic Places (NRHP) in Clarke County
 Dr. Lucius Charles Alston House, Mesa, Arizona, listed on the NRHP in Maricopa County
 Robert A. Alston House, Atlanta, Georgia, listed on the NRHP in DeKalb County
 Smith-Alston House, Richland, Georgia, listed on the NRHP in Stewart County
 Alston House (Glendon, North Carolina), listed on the NRHP in Moore County
 Alston-DeGraffenried Plantation, Pittsboro, North Carolina, listed on the NRHP in Chatham County
 Alston-Bedwell House, Tahlequah, Oklahoma, listed on the NRHP in Cherokee County
 Alston House (Columbia, South Carolina), listed on the NRHP in Richland County
 Emanuel Alston House, Frogmore, South Carolina, listed on the NRHP in Beaufort County